The Henryton Tunnel, located near Henryton in southern Carroll County, Maryland, is the third-oldest tunnel in the world that remains in active railroad use. Constructed by the Baltimore and Ohio (B&O) Railroad and opened around 1850, it was the first tunnel constructed on the B&O's Old Main Line. In 1865 the tunnel was widened to accommodate double track. It was rebuilt into its current form in 1903. The tunnel has brick portals and lining. The coping and footings are concrete.

See also 
 Baltimore and Ohio Railroad
 Industrial Archaeology

References

External links
Steve Okonski's B&O RR Photo Tours from Woodstock to Henryton photos of the tunnel and its approaches
Patapsco Valley State Park

Railroad tunnels in Maryland
Baltimore and Ohio Railroad tunnels
CSX Transportation tunnels
Transportation buildings and structures in Carroll County, Maryland
Tunnels completed in 1850